The 2002 United States Senate election in South Dakota was held on November 5, 2002. Incumbent Democratic U.S. Senator Tim Johnson narrowly won re-election to a second term by a margin of 524 votes, or 0.15%. This made the election the closest race of the 2002 Senate election cycle.

Democratic primary

Candidates 
 Tim Johnson, incumbent U.S. Senator
 Herman Eilers

Results

General election

Candidates 
 Kurt Evans (L), teacher
 Tim Johnson (D), incumbent U.S. Senator
 John Thune (R), U.S. Representative

Campaign 
Thune, who was considered a rising star in his party, ran against Tim Johnson, who narrowly won his first senate election in 1996. Thune launched a television advertising campaign mentioning al Qaeda and Saddam Hussein, contending that both are seeking nuclear weapons and that this country needs a missile defense system, something Johnson voted against 29 times and that Thune supports. The incumbent attacked Thune for politicizing national security. President George W. Bush campaigned for Thune in late October. More than $20 million was spent in the election. Both candidates had raised over $5 million each.

Debates
Complete video of debate, August 27, 2002
Complete video of debate, October 7, 2002
Complete video of debate, October 21, 2002
Complete video of debate, October 24, 2002

Predictions

Results 
Johnson narrowly prevailed over Thune by a mere 532 votes. Despite the extremely close results, Thune did not contest the results and conceded defeat on the late afternoon of November 9. Johnson's narrow victory may be attributed to his strong support in Oglala Lakota County, and to Thune also underperforming in typically Republican areas. Johnson was sworn in for a second term on January 3, 2003. Thune was elected to South Dakota's other Senate seat in 2004, defeating incumbent minority leader Tom Daschle. He served alongside Johnson until the latter retired in 2015.

See also 
 2002 United States Senate elections

References 

South Dakota
2002
2002 South Dakota elections